This was the first edition of the tournament. The tournament originated as a quick replacement for the 2022 edition of the Quito Challenger, which was moved to Cali due to political unrest in Quito.

Facundo Mena won the title after defeating Miljan Zekić 6–2, 7–6(7–3) in the final.

Seeds

Draw

Finals

Top half

Bottom half

References

External links
Main draw
Qualifying draw

Cali Open - 1